Robert Chambers (1571–1628), was a Catholic priest from Yorkshire.

Life
As a boy Chambers was sent to the English College in Rheims to be educated as a Catholic. In 1593 he was admitted to the English College, Rome, where he was ordained priest in 1594. From 1599 to 1623 he was confessor to the English Benedictine nuns in Brussels. He died in Flanders in 1628. He was also a writer and translator.

Works
 Palestina (Florence, 1600), an allegorical romance
 Philip Numan, Miracles lately wrought by the intercession of the Glorious Virgin Mary at Mont-aigu, nere unto Sichen in Brabant, translated out of the French (Antwerp, 1606)

References

1571 births
1628 deaths
English College, Douai alumni
English College, Rome alumni
16th-century English Roman Catholic priests
17th-century English Roman Catholic priests
French–English translators
English expatriates in France
English expatriates in Belgium
Kingdom of England expatriates in France